Rafael Carvalho de Souza (born 27 July 1986) is a Brazilian mixed martial artist who most recently competed in the light heavyweight and middleweight divisions of Bellator MMA, where he was a former Bellator Middleweight World Champion. As of December 2017, Carvalho is tied with Alexander Shlemenko for most title defenses in the division's history. He also won the Smash Fight middleweight championship in 2013.

Mixed martial arts career

Early career

First loss and rebound
Carvalho made his professional mixed martial arts debut against Julio Cesar Araujo Fernandes on 17 December 2011 at Samurai FC 6. Carvalho lost the fight via submission in the first round. Following the loss, Carvalho went on a nine-fight unbeaten streak that included a unanimous decision win over Gustavo Machado that won him the Smash Fight middleweight championship, before signing with Bellator MMA.

Bellator MMA

Road to Bellator middleweight title
Carvalho was expected to make his promotional debut against fellow newcomer Anthony Ruiz on 19 September 2014 at Bellator 125. However, after an injury to Brett Cooper, Carvalho stepped up and faced Brian Rogers in the co-main event. Carvalho won the back-and-forth fight via TKO in the first round.

Carvalho faced kickboxing veteran Joe Schilling on 10 April 2015 at Bellator 136. He won the fight by split decision.

Bellator middleweight champion
Carvalho faced Brandon Halsey in the main event at Bellator 144 for the vacant Bellator Middleweight Championship on 23 October 2015. Carvalho stopped Halsey via a body kick in the second round in an upset. Halsey dominated the first round on the ground; almost finishing Carvalho with an arm-triangle choke. With the comeback victory, Carvalho became the first fighter to defeat Halsey.

Carvalho made his first defense of his title against Melvin Manhoef on 20 May 2016 at Bellator 155. He won via a controversial split decision to retain the Bellator Middleweight Championship. Bellator announcer Jimmy Smith called it one of the worst decisions he had ever seen; likewise 5 of 5 media outlets scored the bout in favor of Manhoef.

An immediate rematch with Manhoef was scheduled to take place at Bellator 168, on 10 December 2016. However, Carvalho pulled out of the fight due to injury. The rematch eventually took place on 8 April 2017 at Bellator 176. Carvalho won the bout via knockout due to a head kick in the fourth round. Following the event, Carvalho was fined $5,000 by the Association of Boxing Commissions (ABC) for unsportsmanlike conduct, due to jumping out the cage in his post-fight celebration.

In a May 2017 interview with MMAfighting.com, Carvalho expressed interest in a bout with newly signed welterweight Rory MacDonald after the two exchanged words on Twitter. In addition, he hoped to make his next title defense in July or August.

In his third title defense, Carvalho faced Alessio Sakara at Bellator 190 on 9 December 2017. He won the fight via knockout in the first round. As a result, Carvalho tied the record for most title defenses, held by Alexander Shlemenko, in the divisions' history (three).

In his fourth title defense, Carvalho faced Gegard Mousasi on 25 May 2018 at Bellator 200 in London. This was the last fight on his contract. He lost the fight via technical knock out in round one.

Return to contender status
On 12 September, it was announced that Carvalho had re-signed with the Bellator MMA promotion. It was also announced that Carvalho is expected to face promotional newcomer and former UFC Light Heavyweight Champion Lyoto Machida on 15 December at Bellator 213. On weigh-in day, Carvalho missed weight, weighing in at 186.5 pounds, over the maximum non-title limit of 186.0 pounds. The bout proceeded at Catchweight and Carvalho was fined 20% of his purse. Carvalho was defeated by split decision.

Carvalho faced Chidi Njokuani at Bellator 224 in a 190 lb Catchweight bout on 12 July 2019. He won the fight by unanimous decision. After the fight with Njokuani, Carvalho announced that he will be moving up to the light heavyweight division.

Move up to light heavyweight
In his light heavyweight debut, Carvalho faced Vadim Nemkov at Bellator 230 on 13 October 2019. After being largely dominated in the fight, Carvalho lost via submission late in the second round.

Carvalho faced Alex Polizzi at Bellator 245 on 11 September 2020. He lost the fight by unanimous decision.

Bellator MMA announced on 27 October 2020, that Carvalho had been released from the promotion.

Return to Middleweight 
After the release from Bellator, Carvalho was set to headline LFA 107 against Sharaf Davlatmurodov on 14 May 2021. However, the bout was called off as Carvalho stepped in as a replacement for Costello van Steenis to face Lorenz Larkin on 6 days notice at Bellator 258 on 7 May 2021. The promotion announced that this bout would be a one off fight deal. Carvalho lost the bout via split decision.

Replacing Tony Johnson, Carvalho faced Dovletdzhan Yagshimuradov on April 15, 2022 at Bellator 277. He lost the fight via TKO in the second round.

Championships and accomplishments
Bellator MMA
Bellator Middleweight World Championship (One time; former)
Three successful title defenses
Tied with Alexander Shlemenko for the most successful Middleweight title defenses in Bellator history (3)
MMA Junkie
October 2015 Knockout of the Month vs. Brandon Halsey
Smash Fight
Smash Fight Middleweight Championship (One time)

Mixed martial arts record

|-
|Loss
|align=center|16–7
|Dovletdzhan Yagshimuradov
|TKO (elbows and punches)
|Bellator 277
|
|align=center|2
|align=center|4:04
|San Jose, California, United States
|
|-
|Loss
|align=center|16–6
|Lorenz Larkin
|Decision (split)
|Bellator 258
|
|align=center|3
|align=center|5:00
|Uncasville, Connecticut, United States
|
|-
|Loss
|align=center|16–5
|Alex Polizzi 
|Decision (unanimous)
|Bellator 245
|
|align=center| 3
|align=center| 5:00
|Uncasville, Connecticut, United States
|
|-
| Loss
| align=center|16–4
| Vadim Nemkov
| Submission (rear-naked choke)
| Bellator 230
| 
| align=center| 2
| align=center| 3:56
| Milan, Italy
| 
|-
|Win
|align=center|16–3
|Chidi Njokuani
|Decision (unanimous) 
|Bellator 224
|
|align=center|3
|align=center|5:00
|Thackerville, Oklahoma, United States
|
|-
|Loss
|align=center|15–3
|Lyoto Machida
|Decision (split)
|Bellator 213
|
|align=center|3
|align=center|5:00
|Honolulu, Hawaii, United States
|
|-
|Loss
|align=center|15–2
|Gegard Mousasi
|TKO (punches)
|Bellator 200
|
|align=center|1
|align=center|3:35
|London, England
|
|-
| Win
| align=center| 15–1
| Alessio Sakara
| KO (punches and elbow)
| Bellator 190
| 
| align=center|1
| align=center|0:44
| Florence, Italy
| 
|-
| Win
| align=center| 14–1
| Melvin Manhoef
| KO (head kick)
| Bellator 176
| 
| align=center| 4
| align=center| 3:15
| Torino, Italy
| 
|-
| Win
| align=center| 13–1
| Melvin Manhoef
| Decision (split)
| Bellator 155
| 
| align=center| 5
| align=center| 5:00
| Boise, Idaho, United States
| 
|-
|Win
|align=center|12–1 
|Brandon Halsey
|TKO (body kick)
|Bellator 144
|
|align=center|2
|align=center|1:42
|Uncasville, Connecticut, United States
|
|-
|Win
|align=center|11–1
|Joe Schilling
|Decision (split)
|Bellator 136
|
|align=center|3
|align=center|5:00
|Irvine, California, United States
|
|-
|Win
|align=center|10–1
|Brian Rogers
|TKO (punches)
|Bellator 125
|
|align=center|1
|align=center|3:06
|Fresno, California, United States
|
|-
|Win
|align=center|9–1
|Mauri Roque
|TKO (knee to the body and punches)
|Talent MMA Circuit 9: Sao Jose dos Pinhais 2014
|
|align=center|1
|align=center|2:47
|São José dos Pinhais, Brazil
|
|-
|Win
|align=center|8–1
|Sergio Souza
|TKO (knee to the body and punches)
|Iron Fight Combat 4
|
|align=center|3
|align=center|2:15
|São José dos Pinhais, Brazil
|
|-
|Win
|align=center|7–1
|Gustavo Machado
|Decision (unanimous)
|Smash Fight 2
|
|align=center|3
|align=center|5:00
|Curitiba, Paraná, Brazil
|
|-
|Win
|align=center|6–1
|Fernando Scherek
|TKO (punches)
|Adventure Fighters Tournament 4
|
|align=center|1
|align=center|0:39
|Curitiba, Paraná, Brazil
|
|-
|Win
|align=center|5–1
|Kaue Dudus
|TKO (punches)
|Samurai FC 9: Water vs. Fire
|
|align=center|2
|align=center|3:48
|Curitiba, Paraná, Brazil
|
|-
|Win
|align=center|4–1
|Eduardo Gimenez
|TKO (punches)
|Empire Promotions: Empire FC
|
|align=center|1
|align=center|0:55
|Curitiba, Paraná, Brazil
|
|-
|Win
|align=center|3–1
|Luiz Cado Simon
|TKO (punches)
|Forca Jovem Parana: Nocaute ao Crack 2
|
|align=center|3
|align=center|N/A
|Curitiba, Paraná, Brazil
|
|-
|Win
|align=center|2–1
|Glauber Valadares
|TKO (punches)
|Predador FC 21
|
|align=center|1
|align=center|2:52
|Campo Grande, Mato Grosso do Sul, Brazil
|
|-
|Win
|align=center|1–1
|Flavio Rodrigo Magon
|TKO (punches)
|Adrenaline Fight 4
|
|align=center|2
|align=center|2:42
|Apucarana, Paraná, Brazil 
|
|-
|Loss
|align=center|0–1
|Julio Cesar Araujo Fernandes
|Submission (anaconda choke) 
|Samurai FC 6
|
|align=center|1
|align=center|N/A
|Curitiba, Paraná, Brazil
|

See also
 List of male mixed martial artists

References

External links
 Rafael Carvalho at Bellator (archived)
 

1986 births
Living people
Brazilian male mixed martial artists
Middleweight mixed martial artists
Mixed martial artists utilizing Muay Thai
Mixed martial artists utilizing Brazilian jiu-jitsu
Brazilian Muay Thai practitioners
Brazilian practitioners of Brazilian jiu-jitsu
Sportspeople from Rio de Janeiro (city)
Bellator MMA champions